Kiril Manolov Rakarov (24 May 1932 - 25 August 2006) was a Bulgarian football player who played as a defender. He represented Bulgaria at the 1956 Summer Olympics and the 1962 FIFA World Cup. For 13 seasons he made 190 league appearances and scored 17 league goals for CSKA Sofia.

Honours

Club
CSKA Sofia
 Bulgarian League (10): 1952, 1954, 1955, 1956, 1957, 1958, 1958–59, 1959–60, 1960–61, 1961–62
 Bulgarian Cup (3): 1953–54, 1954–55, 1960–61

International
Bulgaria
Olympic Bronze Medal: 1956

References

1932 births
2006 deaths
Bulgarian footballers
People from Pavlikeni
PFC CSKA Sofia players
First Professional Football League (Bulgaria) players
1962 FIFA World Cup players
Footballers at the 1952 Summer Olympics
Footballers at the 1956 Summer Olympics
Footballers at the 1960 Summer Olympics
Olympic footballers of Bulgaria
Olympic bronze medalists for Bulgaria
Bulgaria international footballers
Bulgarian football managers
PFC Cherno More Varna managers
Olympic medalists in football
Medalists at the 1956 Summer Olympics
Association football defenders
Sportspeople from Veliko Tarnovo Province